Emrecan Uzunhan (born 26 February 2001) is a Turkish professional footballer who plays as a defender for the Süper Lig club Antalyaspor on loan from Beşiktaş.

Career
On 19 July, 2022 Uzunhan signed a five year deal with Süper Lig club Beşiktaş.

References

2001 births
Living people
Turkish footballers
İstanbulspor footballers
Beşiktaş J.K. footballers
Süper Lig players
TFF First League players
Association football central defenders
Footballers from Istanbul